Angoorlata Deka is an Indian actress and politician from Assam. She is a first term member of the Assam Legislative Assembly.

Political party

Angoorlata is from the Bharatiya Janata Party. She represents the Batadroba constituency of Assam. She joined BJP in December 2015. She is one of the six female candidates who were given tickets by Bharatiya Janata Party, out of which, only two won elections; and Angoorlata is one of them.

Early life and family 
Angoorlata was born in Nalbari, Assam.

Filmography

References 

Living people
Bharatiya Janata Party politicians from Assam
Assam MLAs 2016–2021
21st-century Indian women politicians
21st-century Indian politicians
Actresses in Assamese cinema
Actresses from Assam
People from Nalbari district
People from Nalbari
Women members of the Assam Legislative Assembly
Year of birth missing (living people)